Rhodothamnus sessilifolius, commonly known as the sessile-leaved rhodothamnus, is a flowering plant in the family Ericaceaea. It is endemic to Turkey.  

It is classified as critically endangered by the International Union for Conservation of Nature.

Distribution 
It is found in Turkey.

Taxonomy 
It was described by  Peter Hadland Davis, in Hooker's Icon. Pl. 36: t. 3575 in 1962.

References

External links 

Ericaceae
Critically endangered flora of Asia